The Historical Breechloading Smallarms Association (HBSA) is a learned society supporting the collecting of historic arms and preservation of their heritage within the UK. The HBSA also encourages research and study of historic breech-loading firearms and offers advice on the drafting of UK firearms legislation, particularly where this affects historic arms.

See also
 Breechloader
 List of shooting sports organizations
 MLAGB

References

Sports governing bodies in the United Kingdom
Rifle associations
Gun rights advocacy groups